Pitts is a city in Wilcox County, Georgia, United States. Per the 2020 census, the population was 252.

Geography

Pitts is located at  (31.945270, -83.540004).

History 
The community which later became Pitts began as a settlement in the area of the home of Lyston Clyde Peebles, Sr., two miles east of the Alapaha River. Brock Owens and Ashley J. Pitts operated the first store there in the mid-1880s. Pitts was called Kings' Crossing at the time. When application was made for a post office, the Postmaster General preferred a shorter name. J.A. King suggested the name Pitts, in honor of his son-in-law, Ashley J. Pitts. The name was accepted, and the post office was established on 1 November 1888 with Pitts as postmaster.

The Georgia General Assembly incorporated Pitts as a town in 1905.

On April 20, 1921, various people throughout southwest and south-central Georgia observed a meteor trail across the sky which culminated in an explosion and impact at a minimum of four spots slightly north of Pitts.  Three fragments of the meteorite were recovered, one falling within a few feet of a child playing outside. It was classified as an iron meteorite.  The largest recovered fragment weighed 3.76 kilograms and is currently housed in the Smithsonian Institution Collection.  The other fragments remain in private collections. Local accounts and fragments were collected and documented in the Geological Survey of Georgia Bulletin, Issue 29.

Demographics

2020 census

Note: the US Census treats Hispanic/Latino as an ethnic category. This table excludes Latinos from the racial categories and assigns them to a separate category. Hispanics/Latinos can be of any race.

2000 Census

As of the census of 2000, there were 308 people, 121 households, and 83 families residing in the city. The racial makeup of the city was 76.62% White and 23.38% African American.

There were 121 households, out of which 33.9% had children under the age of 18 living with them, 47.1% were married couples living together, 16.5% had a female householder with no husband present, and 30.6% were non-families. 27.3% of all households were made up of individuals, and 13.2% had someone living alone who was 65 years of age or older.  The average household size was 2.55 and the average family size was 3.11.

In the city, the population was spread out, with 29.9% under the age of 18, 9.4% from 18 to 24, 22.7% from 25 to 44, 23.1% from 45 to 64, and 14.9% who were 65 years of age or older.  The median age was 36 years. For every 100 females, there were 94.9 males.  For every 100 females age 18 and over, there were 92.9 males.

The median income for a household in the city was $24,625, and the median income for a family was $26,058. Males had a median income of $27,500 versus $22,188 for females. The per capita income for the city was $15,103.  About 18.9% of families and 25.3% of the population were below the poverty line, including 38.3% of those under the age of eighteen and 19.6% of those 65 or over.

Education 
The Wilcox County School District holds pre-school to grade twelve, and consists of an elementary school, a middle school, and a high school. The district has 90 full-time teachers and over 1,439 students.

The schools, located in Rochelle, are:
Wilcox County Elementary School
Wilcox County Middle School
Wilcox County High School

References

Cities in Georgia (U.S. state)
Cities in Wilcox County, Georgia